The Tiga GC285, also known as the Tiga GC85, is a sports prototype race car, designed, developed, and built by British manufacturer Tiga Race Cars, for sports car racing, conforming to the Group C2 rules and regulations, in 1985.

References

Sports prototypes
Group C cars